The Burgas Lakes (Burgaski ezera) or Burgas Wetlands (Бургаски влажни зони, Burgaski vlazhni zoni) are a group of coastal lakes of varying saltiness located around the Bulgarian city of Burgas in the proximity of the Black Sea. They constitute the largest group of lakes in the country and comprise some of Bulgaria's biggest and most important lakes.

The lakes' total area (including swamps, marshes, ponds and other reservoirs) amounts to 95 km2, of which 33.30 km2 are either proclaimed or proposed protected areas that are inhabited by a large number of locally or globally endangered species of birds, fish and mammals. Apart from this, the Burgas Lakes are also of economic importance, used to obtain sea salt and curative mud, as well as to supply the local economy with fresh water, in the case of Lake Mandrensko.

The lakes comprise (in north to south order):

 Lake Pomorie, an ultrasaline lagoon
 Lake Atanasovsko, a nature reserve and Ramsar site
 Lake Burgas or Lake Vaya, the largest natural lake in the country by area
 Lake Poda, sometimes regarded as a part of Lake Mandrensko
 Lake Mandrensko, now a fresh water reservoir, the largest of the group

Gallery